{{DISPLAYTITLE:C9H10O5}}
The molecular formula C9H10O5 (molar mass: 198.17 g/mol, exact mass 198.052823) may refer to:
 Ethyl gallate, an antioxidant food additive
 Syringic acid, a polyphenol
 Vanillylmandelic acid, a catecholamine